Hugh Thomson  (1 June 18607 May 1920) was an Irish Illustrator born at Coleraine near Derry. He is best known for his pen-and-ink illustrations of works by authors such as Jane Austen, Charles Dickens, and J. M. Barrie. Thomson inaugurated the Cranford School of illustration with the publication of the 1891 Macmillan reissue of Mrs. Gaskell's Cranford.

Biography
Hugh Thomson was born to tea merchant John Thomson (1822–1894) and shopkeeper Catherine (née Andrews) (d. 1871). He was the eldest of their three surviving children. Although he had no formal artistic training, as a young boy he would often fill his schoolbooks with drawings of horses, dogs, and ships. He attended Coleraine Model School, but left at the age of fourteen to work as a clerk at E. Gribbon & Sons, Linen Manufacturers. Several years later his artistic talents were discovered, and in 1877 he was hired by printing and publishing company Marcus Ward & Co.

On 29 December 1884 Thomson married Jessie Naismith Miller in Belfast. Soon afterwards they moved back to London for Thomson's career. They had one son together, John, born in 1886.

In 1911, he and his family moved to Sidcup, hoping to improve their "ever delicate health." Thomson's correspondence reflects the fact that he missed being close to the National Gallery and the museums where he usually compiled research for his illustrations. During World War I, demand for Thomson's work decreased to a few propaganda pamphlets and some commissions from friends. By 1917, Thomson had fallen on financial hardship and he had to take a job with the Board of Trade, where he worked until 1919.

Thomson died of heart disease at his home in Wandsworth Common on 7 May 1920.

Career
At the age of 17, Thomson joined the art department at Marcus Ward & Co. There his mentor was John Vinycomb, head of the art department. Vinycomb and Thomson's cousin, Mrs. William H. Dodd, encouraged his artistic development during the first years of his career.

Thomson's artistic ambitions led him to London in 1883 where he became a leading contributor The English Illustrated Magazine. He first worked for the magazine with Randolph Caldecott on the 1885–86 issue, and later collaborated with Herbert Railton on the 1887–88 issue. His style at the time is said to be in the "straight tradition of Caldecott."

Thomson also gained praise and influenced many young artists through his book illustrations. He notably illustrated editions of William Shakespeare, Jane Austen, and Charles Dickens. His illustrations for Elizabeth Gaskell's Cranford (1891) inspired a slew of publishers to produce a series of gift books in a similar style ("crown octavo with three edges gilt, bound in dark green cloth, front and spine heavily stamped in gold"). Between 1886 and 1900, he illustrated a set of small classics for Macmillans and Kegan Paul. Much of his work during that period consisted of elaborately illustrated gift books and reprints of popular classics. Thomson's most popular illustrations were "fine line drawing of rural characters and gentle countrified society."

His works were featured in a number of exhibitions during his lifetime, including an 1899 exhibit at the Birmingham and Midland Institute  and a 1910 exhibit of his watercolor drawings for Shakespeare's The Merry Wives of Windsor at The Leicester Galleries in London. His illustrations were also featured in an 1891 exhibit with fellow illustrator Kate Greenaway at the Fine Art Society.

Methods

Thomson is best known for his pen-and-ink illustrations. He prepared most of his work in black and white until the early years of the 20th century, but would sometimes tint pieces for exhibits. The earliest known example of this was for the 1899 Birmingham and Midland Institute exhibition, where he colored the Cranford illustrations he had first drawn eight years earlier. Throughout his career Thomson occasionally dabbled with watercolors, but only used color in his illustrations in response to his publishers' demand. His first book illustrations prepared and printed fully in color were for the last two books in the Cranford series, Scenes of Clerical Life (1906) and Silas Marner (1907).

When working on a new illustration, Thomson would research his subject in the British Museum and the Victoria and Albert Museum. He would often take detailed notes on costumes, furniture, old prints, and architectural records. His attention to detail can be seen in his sketchbooks, which include pages devoted to the changing styles of ladies' bonnets and descriptions of "the details of a cavalry officer's regimentals, together with a series of studies of how such an officer would hold the reins of his mount." When illustrating a series of pieces set in the same location, Thomson would maintain the details of each room, hallway, or facade, drawing them from different angles throughout the publication.

Thomson was often praised for his ability to "project himself into a story." Much of his work has become inseparable from the publications themselves. Such is the case with his illustrations for Pride and Prejudice and the other Austen novels. When J. M. Barrie's Quality Street was published with Thomson's illustrations in 1913, the art critic for the Daily News stated, "The Barrie-Thomson combination is as perfect in its way as that of Gilbert and Sullivan."

Thomson was elected RI, a member of the Royal Society of Painters in Water Colours in 1897 and retired in 1907.

The Cranford School
Thomson was the first of the Cranford School of illustrators who abandoned the 1890s style of Beardsley for the delicacy of an eighteenth-century mode. The 'Cranford School' of illustration was not so much a 'school' with a common training, but more of a style which celebrated a sentimental, pre-industrial notion of ‘old England’. The style was named for Thomson's illustrations of the  Macmillan reissue of Mrs. Gaskell's Cranford. Cranford was the first of a series of 24 volumes, of which Thomson illustrated 11. Felmingham includes the Cranford School within a broader movement that he called the Wig and Powder School which he states reflected an aspect of contemporary taste that . . . is sometimes called the 'Queen Ann revival'''. Felmingham included the popularity of such architectural features as high-pitched roof, Flemish gables, and white or green painted sash windows as an outward expression of the revival. Jenkins states that the term Wig and Powder School is loosely equivalent to the Cranford School and that the latter term was mostly used between 1890 and 1914.

The style was a nostalgic, affectionate and slightly whimsical approach to historical themes. and was  distinguished by graphic nostalgia for a philistinism that was no more. The members of the school had all been fired by the literature, art, costume or atmosphere of England in the eighteenth century and became dealers in nostalgia on a very large scale. It was a style of illustration harking back to pre-industrial rural England, which specialized in the nostalgic recreation of a by-gone golden era before the  ravages of industrialization.  Cooke notes that the style involved the careful representation of Regency dress and interiors, pastoral settings and sharp characterization which was based on a close reading of the text. The emergence of the Cranford School style was only possible because photo-mechanical reproduction of drawings allowed the fine pen lines distinctive of the school to be reproduced, which was impossible with the older technique of wood engravings.

Thomson was the originator of the school. Other members of the school were:
C. E. Brock  (18701938)
H. M. Brock  (18751960)
Christiana Mary Demain Hammond (18601900), who signed her work Chris Hammond.
Fred Pegram  (18701937)
F. H. Townsend (18681920)

Thomson's illustration of Cranford

The following illustrations by Thomson for the 1891 Macmillan Cranford give some flavour of the book that inaugurated the Cranford School. The book has 111 illustrations in total.

Selected works

In total, Thomson illustrated sixty-five books and contributed a large number of illustrations to magazines and other periodicals. The following list of publications includes a number of his works. External links lead to digitized copies on Internet Archive unless otherwise noted.
Illustrations in The English Illustrated Magazine (first appeared in the 1885–86 issue)Days with Sir Roger De Coverley (1886) digital copyCoaching Days and Coaching Ways (1888) digital copyCranford (1891) digital copyThe Vicar of Wakefield (1891) digital copyThe Ballad of Beau Brocade (1892) digital copyOur Village (1893) digital copyPride and Prejudice (1894) digital copyThe Story of Rosina and other Verses (1895) digital copyEmma (1896) digital copySense and Sensibility (1896) digital copyMansfield Park (1897) digital copyNorthanger Abbey (1898) digital copyPersuasion (1898) digital copyThe Illustrated Fairy Books (1898)
Illustrations for twelve volumes in the Highways and Byways series, including Donegal and Antrim (1899) digital copyPeg Woffington (1899) digital copyA Kentucky Cardinal (1901) digital copyThe History of Henry Esmond (1905) digital copy
Illustrations for eleven of the twenty-four volumes in the Cranford series (gift books), including Evelina (1903) digital copy, Scenes of Clerical Life (1906) digital copy, and Silas Marner (1907) digital copyAs You Like It (1909) digital copy, digital copyThe Merry Wives of Windsor digital copyQuality Street (1913) digital copyTom Brown's Schooldays (1918) digital copyAn Irish Horse FairGallery

Notes

References

Further reading
Spielmann, M. H. and W. C. Jerrold. Hugh Thomson: his art, his letters, his humour and his charm. London: A. & C. Black, 1931. Print.
Fitzpatrick, Olivia, and Debby Shorley. Illustrated by Hugh Thomson, 1860–1920. Library, University of Ulster at Belfast, 1989. Print.
Hugh Thomson as a book illustrator. Victorian Web.

External links

 
 
 
The 1891  Cranford, online at the Internet Archive. This is the book that inaugurated the Cranford School''.
The 1898 Cranford, online at the British Library. This edition replacing some of the original 1891 pen and ink illustrations by Thomson with coloured illustrations by him.
Hugh Thomson collection at Mount Holyoke Special Collections
Hugh Thomson collection at Coleraine Museum Archive
Hugh Thomson Illustration Collection: Online Exhibition on YouTube.
Works by Hugh Thomson in Flickr Commons

1860 births
1920 deaths
Irish illustrators
People from Coleraine, County Londonderry